was the father of Okinawaology and a Japanese scholar who studied various aspects of Japanese and Okinawan culture, customs, linguistics, and lore.  His signature was Ifa Fuyu in English, because of the Okinawan pronunciation. Iha studied linguistics in the University of Tokyo and was devoted to the study of Okinawan linguistics, folklore, and history. His most famous book on the subject, Ko Ryūkyū (Old Ryūkyū), was published in 1911 and remains one of the best works on Okinawan studies. He devoted much time to the discovery of the origins of Okinawan people to establish their history. He had considerable influence not only on the study of Okinawan folklore but also of Japanese folklore.

Life
In 1876, he was born in Naha as an eldest son of a lower-class pechin.
In 1891, he entered Okinawa Middle School, now corresponding to Shuri High School.
In 1895, he was dismissed from school, because he was a leader of a student strike; they requested the resignation of the then principal who dropped the subject of English (English is needed for higher schools).
In 1896, he entered Meijigikai Middle School in Tokyo, followed by the Third Higher School (Now Kyoto University).
In 1903, he entered the linguistic course, Department of Literature, Tokyo University.
In 1906, he graduated from Tokyo University.
In 1910, he was appointed the director of Okinawa Prefectural Library.
In 1917, he organized the study of Esperanto.
In 1918, he lectured on the Bible at a church.
In 1921, he was appointed the director of Okinawa Prefectural Library formally.
In 1924, he resigned from the library and went to Tokyo to study more.
In 1935, he lectured on Omorosoushi at Kokugakuin University.
In 1945, he assumed the post of the first president of the Association of Okinawan People.
On August 13, 1947, he died at the house of Higa Shuncho.

Achievements
 Ko Ryūkyū [the ancient Loochoos], 1911, 1916, 1942, 1944, 2000. [in Japanese, his representative work]
 Revised Omoro Sōshi, 1925, Minamishima, danwakai. [in Japanese]
 Ryūkyū no Hōgen [dialects of the Loochoos] 琉球の方言, Kokugo kagaku kōza, no. VII: Kokugo hōgengaku, fascicle no. 5, [1933]; rpt. within the single-vol. version of the course as Tōjō Misao 東條操 et al., Kokugo hōgengaku [dialectology of the national language] 國語方言學, [1935], both: Meiji Shoin, Tokyo. [in Japanese]
 An Island of Onari Kami, 1938, 1942. [in Japanese]
 Selected works of Iha Fuyu, 1962. Okinawa Times. [in Japanese]
 Collected Works of Iha Fuyu (1–11), 1976 and 1993, Heibonsha, Tokyo. [in Japanese]

Ko Ryukyu
This is his representative work and has remained an introduction to Okinawaology. He had corrected previous articles many times, and the reader should read the most recent edition.

Linguistic study
Studying various words of Ryukyu and Japan used in days gone by, he came to the conclusion that Okinawa and Japan share the same mother tongue. The studied words include akaru, akezu, akatonki, amori, etsuri, fuguri (scrotum), fuku,  hae (glory), hau, hiji, hiraku, hoso (umbricus), kanashi, iga, ikasarete, ikibui, ikutokoro, ime, iriki, kabuchi, kotoi, kuwanari, magu, majimono, mamaki, maru, minjai, mitsumi, monowata,  mumuji, naegu, nai (earthquake),  nasu, nuuji, sakuri, sayumi, shichiyadan, shishi, taani, tane (penis), tsukakamachi, tsukura, tubi, ugonaari, uwanari, wa, watamashi, yagusami, yokoshi, yomu, and yuimaharu.

The recent trend of the History of the Ryukyus

Three representative statesmen were described. They were given posthumous court ranks at the enthronement of Emperor Taishō, and Iha gave a lecture about them at the Okinawa Normal School. They were Sai On, Haneji Choshu (Shō Shōken (向象賢)) and Giwan Chōho. They managed to govern Ryukyu between Satsuma and China. Iha regarded them as the most important figures in Ryukyuan history.

Sai On's advice to the King: Negotiations with China are not difficult. If difficulties will arise, Kume people can manage to handle them. But Japan is not so. On one day, with only a piece of paper, a King may lose his position and it is definitely from Japan.

Okinawa's stand: to Okinawa, who will rule in China does not matter. Okinawa is not allowed to stick to justice. Okinawan people endure everything in order to live, or eat. An Okinawan saying says that who will let us eat, whoever it is, is our master. This is the fate of Okinawan people until the day of the placement of Okinawa Prefecture. To Japan, namely to the Shimazu clan, it did not know how to treat Okinawa soon after the establishment of Okinawa Prefecture.

Seven kinds of Omoro Sōshi

Omoro Sōshi is a collection of songs, 1553 poems and 1267 poems (when the same songs are excluded) in 22 volumes, starting in the middle of the 13th century and ending in the middle of the 17th century. It may be called the Man'yōshū of Okinawa. Omoro is the abbreviation of Omori uta, or songs sung in the sacred places of Ryukyu. The themes of the Omoro include the origin of Ryukyu, Kings, Heroes, Voyages, Poets, Sceneries, Heaven and Stars, very rarely Romance. Omoro is the primary source for studying the Ryukyuan languages and ideologies.

The problem of students studying in China (Kansho)
China allowed Ryukyuan princes and others to study in China; at first, Ryukyuan students did not get good achievements. The great king Shō Shin started to allow the people of the town of Kume, who had come from China only 128 years before, to study in China. They spoke Chinese of course, and got high achievements. Four students from Kume who studied in Nanjing came back seven years later. Four others on the next turn, came back seven years later. The people of Kume eventually came to believe that students only came from Kume. Toward the end of the 18th century, the Ryukyuan government, based in Shuri, realized that education and politics went hand in hand and thought students should be also from Shuri. The people of Kume resisted with strikes. This is called the Kansho Problem or Soudou.

The P sound in Okinawan dialects
The changes of the sound of P → F → H in Ryukyuan dialects suggest the changes from P through F to H in the languages of historical Japan proper.
Take care that this is in Ko Ryukyu. 

In Late Middle Japanese　it is written that although Proto-Japanese had a *[p], by Old Japanese it had already become [ɸ] and subsequently [h] during Early Modern Japanese where it remains today.

Other Works
The weakest point of Okinawan People, The establishment of Okinawa Prefecture from the viewpoint of evolution, Did Heike people really come to Sakishima? Important place Urasoe, What does Shimajiri mean in many islands of Okinawa? A mysterious man Amawari, Documents of Wakou in Okinawa, A lovely Yaeyama girl, Nakasone Toyomiya in Miyako, Grand kumi stages of old Ryukyu, Poems of Southern Islands, The Bible translated into the Ryukyu language by Bernard Jean Bettelheim, On Konkō-kenshū (Old Ryukyu language dictionary), Akainko, the first Okinawan music musician. Mythologies in Okinawa.

Okinawaology
Okinawaology is not an independent field of science, but a general term of various aspects of Okinawa studies. Okinawaology originated from Iha's Ko Ryukyu (Old Ryukyu).

In General
Since Ryukyu was annexed by Japan, the Okinawan people were forcefully assimilated into Japanese imperial culture. With this as the background, Iha studied the culture of both Japan and Okinawa, especially, the languages, history of Okinawa, and proposed the Okinawan people and Japanese people had the same ancestors. His studies started from Omorosoushi, and covered the study of history, linguistics, anthropology, archaeology, study of religions, mythology, the study of civilization, ethnology and literature.  Using the Okinawan language, he tried to raise the pride of Okinawans in their land. His proposals have been established as the basis of Okinawaology. Those who study Okinawaology are not restricted to scholars. Okinawaology covers many other branches, such as politics, economics, laws, and natural circumstances.

Tomb
His tomb is at Urasoe Castle showing the following epitaph.

Related persons
Shinmura Izuru (1876–1967), Torii Ryūzō (1870–1953), Kunio Yanagita (1875–1962), Shinobu Orikuchi (1887–1953), Yanagi Sōetsu (1889–1961), Minakata Kumagusu (1867–1941), Hajime Kawakami (1879–1946), Kyōsuke Kindaichi (1882–1971), Shirō Hattori (1908–1995)  
Higashionna Kanjun (1882–1963): Historian concerning Okinawa, Professor at Takushoku University.
Tajima Risaburo (1869–1929): Teacher of Iha. He studied Omorosoushi and gave documents of Omorosoushi to Iha.
Higa Shuncho (1883–1977): Okinawa historian. Esperantist.
Majikina Anko (1875–1933): One of the co-leaders of the strike. Historian. In 1925, he became the director of the Okinawa Prefectural Library. His 1000 year history of Okinawa was said to be an encyclopedia of Okinawa.
Hashimoto Shinkichi (1882–1945): Japanese language scholar.
Ogura Shinpei (1882–1944): Japanese language scholar.
Kinjo Choei (1902–1955): Okinawan language scholar.
Nakahara Zenchu (1890–1964): Okinawan culture scholar. Author of Omorosoushi Encyclopedia (1978) and History of Ryukyu (1978).
Nakasone Seizen (1907–1995): After meeting Iha at Tokyo University, he studied the dialect of Okinawa. He led nursing students at the end of the war and spoke for peace.
Shibuzawa Keizo (1896–1963): Minister of Finance, Folklore scholar.
Hokama Shuzen (b. 1924 ): Okinawan culture scholar.
Sasaki Nobutsuna (1872–1963): Tanka poet, Japanese language scholar.
Shimbukuro Gen-ichiro (1885–1942): Okinawa culture scholar.
Kanna Kenwa(1877–1950): The main leader of the strike. Governor of Okinawa Narahara Shigeru helped him graduate the school. He joined the Russo-Japanese war and became a rear admiral of the Japanese Navy, and a representative of the lower house.
Iha Getsujo, (1880–1945): A younger brother of Iha Fuyu. Newspaperman of Okinawa Mainichi newspaper.
Kanagusuku Kiko (1875–1967): One　of　the　co-leaders　of　the　strike.　Became　the first　physician　in Okinawa and　the director　of　Okinawa Prefectural Hospital.
Teruya Hiroshi (1875–1939): One of the co-leaders of the strike. After studying engineering at Kyoto University, he went to Taiwan, and later he became Mayor of Naha. He contributed to the clarification of the victims of the Mudan Incident of 1871.
Nishime Goro or Tokuda Goro(1873–1938):
Kishaba Eijun (1885–1972): After meeting Iha, he studied the local aspects of Yaeyama.
Kodama Kihachi (1856–1912): The vice principal (November 1889 – September 1891) and principal (September 1891 – April 1896) of Okinawa Normal School. In 1894, he wanted to discontinue English and a student strike began.

Notes 

Wonder - Okinawa on Iha Fuyu
Iha Fuyu Library Catalogue, in Japanese
Institute for Okinawan studies, in Japanese
 Iha Fuyu, edit. Hokama Shuzen 2000 Ko Ryukyu, Iwanami Bunko, . In Japanese

References

People from Okinawa Prefecture
Ryukyuan people
Academic staff of the University of Tokyo
1876 births
1947 deaths
20th-century Japanese historians
Historians of Japan
University of Tokyo alumni